Nick Shen (born 26 August 1976) is a Singaporean actor and singer. He was prominently a full-time Mediacorp artiste from 1999 to 2012 but continues to film on an ad-hoc basis. He has been working on the promotion of Chinese opera in Singapore. He was in 8 Superstars 八大巨星 2007 Chinese New Year album 好日子

Career
Nick Shen joined MediaCorp after winning the local edition of Star Search Singapore in 1999. Besides acting he has written and performed his own songs, some of which were used for MediaCorp drama theme songs. He left MediaCorp in early 2012 and has since been working on the promotion of Chinese opera in Singapore. Nick Shen is the global winner for Ten Outstanding Young Person of the World and JCI Cultural Achievement Honoure Award winner in 2014. He was awarded the most outstanding Junior Chamber International member in 2015.

Filmography

Chinese/Dialect Series

Accolades

References

External links
Profile on xin.msn.com
Bio on J Team website
Archived Bio on MediaCorp TV website

1983 births
Living people
Singaporean male television actors
Singaporean people of Teochew descent